Thomas O'Riordan (12 July 1937 – 20 June 2022) was an Irish long-distance runner. He competed in the men's 5000 metres at the 1964 Summer Olympics.

O'Riordan ran collegiately at Idaho State University in Pocatello, Idaho, where he won the 1959 NAIA Men's Cross Country Championship individual title. O'Riordan was inducted into the Idaho State University Hall of Fame in 1979.

He later worked for many years as the athletics correspondent for the Irish Independent.

O'Riordan died on 20 June 2022 at the age of 84.

References

External links
 

1937 births
2022 deaths
Athletes (track and field) at the 1964 Summer Olympics
Irish male long-distance runners
Olympic athletes of Ireland
Idaho State University alumni
Idaho State Bengals men's track and field athletes